The AeroVironment T-20 unmanned aerial vehicle (UAV) (formerly Arcturus T-20) is a medium range, composite aircraft capable of internal and external payloads. Launched from a portable catapult, it can be recovered with a shipboard landing system, or belly land on unimproved surfaces. The T-20 carries a retractable gimbal-mounted, digitally stabilized, electro-optical/infrared (EO/IR) camera that relays video in real time via a C-band LOS data link to the ground control station (GCS).  Powered by a 4-stroke, fuel injected gasoline engine, the aircraft burns  of fuel per hour at cruise.  AeroVironment, Inc. acquired Arcturus UAV, the original developer of JUMP 20 and T-20 on February 22, 2021.

Development

The T-20 was developed in 2009 in Rohnert Park, California as an Intelligence, Surveillance and Reconnaissance platform with payload capacity for a gimbal camera, and wing mounted drop pods.  Flight testing of the prototype T-20 was completed at Edwards Air Force Base in February 2009.  The first air drop test was completed in August 2009 at Camp Roberts California with payloads provided by the Naval Postgraduate School.  October 2009 The T-20 flew air drops at the 2009 Precision Airdrop Technology Conference and Demonstration (PATCAD) at Yuma Proving Ground in support of the Naval Postgraduate School Snowflake guided para foil.

In March 2012, the Naval Air Systems Command (NAVAIR) included the T-20 UAV in multi-award IDIQ contract N00019-12-D-0010 for ISR Services.  

In California on October 24, 2012, the T-20 made aviation history as the first unmanned aerial vehicle to detect and avoid a general aviation manned aircraft using an ADS-B transponder.  The event was sponsored by the Cascade Chapter of AUVSI.

The aircraft flew for eight hours before landing.

The T-20 and JUMP 20 are used extensively with the Mexican Navy. The T-20 is also operated by the Turkish government.

Design
The T-20 does not require an airfield to operate and lands on dirt, grass, desert, or gravel roads. The internal payload bay allows for sensor arrays to be pre-assembled on payload pallets that attach from the bottom of the aircraft. The T-20 system includes three aircraft, ground control station, portable launcher, and support trailer for equipment and personnel.

Operational history
On 18 August 2022, the U.S. Army selected the AeroVironment Jump 20, the vertical takeoff and landing version of the T-20, as part of the first increment of the Future Tactical Unmanned Aircraft System (FTUAS). This was part of an effort started in 2018 to replace the RQ-7 Shadow with a drone that was runway independent, had a lower acoustic signature and had lower equipment requirements to transport. The Army awarded AeroVironment an $8 million contract to provide one Jump 20 system, which consists of six air vehicles, ground data terminals and ground control stations for one brigade combat team; up to seven more systems could be acquired. Increment one of the FTUAS is meant to immediately meet operational units' needs, while increment two will rely on a separate competitive acquisition. The Army received the first system on 12 September 2022.

On 24 February 2023, one year since the start of the 2022 Russian invasion of Ukraine, the Jump 20 was included in an American aid package for Ukraine. As part of the Ukraine Security Assistance Initiative (USAI), it will be bought from the manufacturer and be delivered in late spring or later.

Variants
Variations of the T-20 are the Block I (Carburettor) and Block II (Fuel Injected).

Specifications

See also

References
This article contains material that originally came from the web article Sagetech, Arcturus Team to Demonstrate Joint Ops With ADS-B by Brett Davis, October 24, 2012, which exists in the Public Domain.
This article contains material that originally came from the web article Arcturus Unmanned Aerial Vehicle by Marine Sgt. Rocky Smith, which exists in the Public Domain.
This article contains material that originally came from the web article Unmanned Aerial Vehicles by Greg Goebel, which exists in the Public Domain.
This article contains material that originally came from the web article Pentagon to Test Guided Parachute Drops From UAVs by PM Staff June 2009, which exists in the Public Domain.

External links

 Popular Mechanics T-20 UAV
 AeroVironment T-20
 AeroVironment Jump 20

2000s United States military reconnaissance aircraft
Unmanned aerial vehicles of the United States
T-20
T-20
Single-engined tractor aircraft